Cumberland County is a county located in the Pennyroyal Plateau region of the U.S. state of Kentucky. As of the 2020 census, the population was 5,888. Its county seat is Burkesville. The county was formed in 1798 and named for the Cumberland River, which in turn may have been named after the Duke of Cumberland or the English county of Cumberland.

History
Cumberland County was created in 1798 from land given by Green County. In 1829, the first commercial oil well in the United States was dug three miles north of Burkesville. It is usually not recognized as a commercial well because the drillers were looking for salt brine, but the oil was bottled and sold.

It was the first county in the United States to elect a female sheriff, Pearl Carter Pace.

Burkesville is the first town downstream from Wolf Creek Dam, so it is considered flood-proof, but there have been concerns about leaks at the dam. The U.S. Army Corps of Engineers completed repairs in 2013.

Geography
Major waterways include the Cumberland River and a small branch of Dale Hollow Lake which covers the southern end of the county.

Adjacent counties
 Adair County  (north)
 Russell County  (northeast)
 Clinton County  (east)
 Clay County, Tennessee  (south)
 Monroe County  (west)
 Metcalfe County  (northwest)

Demographics

As of the census of 2000, there were 7,147 people, 2,976 households, and 2,038 families residing in the county. The racial makeup of the county was 95.28% White, 3.41% Black or African American, 0.14% Native American, 0.04% Asian, 0.06% Pacific Islander, 0.15% from other races, and 0.91% from two or more races.  0.60% of the population were Hispanic or Latino of any race.

There were 2,976 households, out of which 29.40% had children under the age of 18 living with them, 53.00% were married couples living together, 11.20% had a female householder with no husband present, and 31.50% were non-families. 28.90% of all households were made up of individuals, and 14.50% had someone living alone who was 65 years of age or older.  The average household size was 2.37 and the average family size was 2.89.

In the county, the population was spread out, with 23.60% under the age of 18, 6.90% from 18 to 24, 26.80% from 25 to 44, 24.80% from 45 to 64, and 17.90% who were 65 years of age or older.  The median age was 40 years. For every 100 females there were 92.70 males.  For every 100 females age 18 and over, there were 89.10 males.

The median income for a household in the county was $21,572, and the median income for a family was $28,701. Males had a median income of $21,313 versus $16,548 for females. The per capita income for the county was $12,643.  About 16.40% of families and 23.80% of the population were below the poverty line, including 30.30% of those under age 18 and 33.00% of those age 65 or over.

Ancestry/ethnicity
As of 2017 the largest self-identified ancestry groups/ethnic groups in Cumberland County, Kentucky were:

Communities

City
 Burkesville (county seat)

Census-designated place
 Marrowbone

Other unincorporated places

 Amandaville
 Bakerton
 Bow
 Dubre
 Green Grove
 Grider
 Judio
 Kettle
 Modoc
 Peytonsburg
 Waterview

Politics
Like all of the heavily Unionist eastern Pennyroyal, a region of largely small farms that did not rely heavily on slavery, Cumberland County provided an exceptionally large number of soldiers for the Union Army during the Civil War. Reflecting that, the county became and has remained overwhelmingly Republican following the end of the Reconstruction Era. As of 2012, Cumberland County had the fewest registered Democrats, 844, out of all of Kentucky's counties.

The last Democrat to carry Cumberland County at the Presidential level was Horatio Seymour in 1868. And since at least 1896, Lyndon Johnson in his 1964 landslide is the solitary Democrat to top forty percent of the county's vote.

Cumberland County was a dry county prior to a special election held June 28, 2016, where the measure passed 1,441 votes to 1,069 votes.

Notable people
 William M. Branham, American Christian minister and faith healer who initiated the post–World War II healing revival.
 Cumberland County was the birthplace of Joel Cheek who later made Maxwell House coffee.
 Edwin L. Norris, fifth Governor of Montana
 David L. Williams, judge of the Kentucky 40th Circuit Court, former President of the Kentucky Senate, 1992 Republican candidate for U.S. Senate, and the 2011 Republican gubernatorial nominee

See also
 Morgan's Raid
 National Register of Historic Places listings in Cumberland County, Kentucky
 Cumberland River
 Dale Hollow Lake

References

External links
 The Kentucky Highlands Project
 Cumberland County Public Library
 Wolf Creek Dam

 
1798 establishments in Kentucky
Kentucky counties
Populated places established in 1798
Counties of Appalachia